Arkansas Highway 98 (AR 98 and Hwy. 98) is an east–west state highway in Columbia County, Arkansas. The  route travels essentially in an incomplete loop with Magnolia at its center. The route begins at U.S. Route 82 (US 82) near Waldo and intersects US 371, US 79, US 82, and US 79 before terminating at AR 19. An officially designated exception over US 371 of  occurs near the eastern terminus.

Route description
AR 98 begins at US 82 west of Waldo. Continuing east past the National Register of Historic Places-listed Waldo Water Tower, AR 98 intersects AR 98B (its only business route) in McNeil. The highway forms a concurrency with US 79 briefly north before turning east then south.

AR 98 continues south through the community of Village before intersecting US 82 in east Columbia County. The route passes near the W. H. Allen House in rural Columbia County and the William H. Smith House in Atlanta. Now turning west the route passes through Emerson where it intersects US 79 and becomes Main Street. The highway continues west to Walkerville, where it ends at AR 19.

History
AR 98 was originally designated from US 64 in Altus to AR 109. This highway was deleted in 1929, and is now AR 179 and Kirk Road, while the bridge over the Arkansas River has since been destroyed.

The current AR 98 was designated in 1940 from Waldo to McNeil, replacing one of the sections of AR 3, which was decommissioned. The road has since been extended in both directions.

Major intersections

McNeil business route

Highway 98 Business (AR 98B, Ark. 98B, and Hwy. 98B) is a business route in McNeil. Prior to designation as AR 98B in 1970, the route was designated as US 79 City.

See also

References

External links

098
Transportation in Columbia County, Arkansas